

526001–526100 

|-bgcolor=#f2f2f2
| colspan=4 align=center | 
|}

526101–526200 

|-bgcolor=#f2f2f2
| colspan=4 align=center | 
|}

526201–526300 

|-bgcolor=#f2f2f2
| colspan=4 align=center | 
|}

526301–526400 

|-bgcolor=#f2f2f2
| colspan=4 align=center | 
|}

526401–526500 

|-id=460
| 526460 Ceciliakoocen ||  || The Dr. Cecilia Koo Botanic Conservation Center (KBCC) in Taiwan possesses the world's largest collection of approximately 34,000 taxa of tropical and subtropical living plants and provides researches around the globe with materials from their collection for free (Src). || 
|-id=492
| 526492 Theaket ||  || Amalthea Ketskarova Masiero (born 2021) is the daughter of the American astronomer Joseph Masiero, who discovered this minor planet. || 
|}

526501–526600 

|-bgcolor=#f2f2f2
| colspan=4 align=center | 
|}

526601–526700 

|-bgcolor=#f2f2f2
| colspan=4 align=center | 
|}

526701–526800 

|-bgcolor=#f2f2f2
| colspan=4 align=center | 
|}

526801–526900 

|-bgcolor=#f2f2f2
| colspan=4 align=center | 
|}

526901–527000 

|-bgcolor=#f2f2f2
| colspan=4 align=center | 
|}

References 

526001-527000